Chappers and Dave was the name of an irregular BBC Radio 1 cover show presented by Mark Chapman and David Vitty. The format  usually only aired when the pair covered other DJs' absences. The format was abandoned following Chapman's departure from Radio 1 on 24th December 2009.

In late 2010, Chapman and Vitty presented their own show on BBC Radio 5 Live called Commentary Selection Box.

Significant Cover Work

The pair had no regular slot on Radio 1 and usually only covered occasional weekend shows for one or two-week periods, but sometimes covered shows for significant periods of time.

The idea for a dedicated cover show was conceived between JK and Joel joining the station in July 2004 and Scott Mills moving to a daytime slot. They hosted a sports programme from May to July 2004, airing from 1pm to 4pm. The pair also presented Radio 1's Weekend Early Breakfast Show for two months in 2008 after Nihal left the show until Nick Grimshaw started in the role. They also covered the 'Lie-In' on Sunday mornings in late 2008, to fill the gap between Dick and Dom leaving the show and Sara Cox taking over in 2009.

Individually

Both Chapman and Vitty appeared separately on other shows.  Chapman contributed to The Scott Mills Show that aired on weekdays from 4pm - 7pm while Vitty contributed to The Chris Moyles Show (weekdays 6:30am - 10am). Chapman presented his last show on the station on Thursday 24 December 2009 and his subsequent work has focused on sports journalism, principally for BBC Radio 5 Live and ESPN.

Both Chapman and Vitty occasionally covered shows separately.

Other appearances

The pair appeared in and won a celebrity episode of The Weakest Link.  In 2008, they raised over £175,000 for Sport Relief by running a mile at every Premiership football ground in England and Scotland in eight days.  Chapman also completed the 2008 Flora London Marathon for children's cancer charity CLIC Sargent.

References

External links

BBC Radio 1 programmes